The 1864 United States presidential election in Oregon took place on November 8, 1864, as part of the 1864 United States presidential election. Voters chose three representatives, or electors, to the Electoral College, who voted for president and vice president.

Oregon was won by the incumbent President Abraham Lincoln (R-Illinois), running with former Senator and Military Governor of Tennessee Andrew Johnson, with 53.90% of the popular vote, against the 4th Commanding General of the United States Army George B. McClellan (D–New Jersey), running with Representative George H. Pendleton, with 46.10% of the vote.

Results

See also
 United States presidential elections in Oregon

References

Oregon
1864
1864 Oregon elections